Ventura volcanic field is an extinct volcanic field located in the Mexican state of San Luis Potosí, its name is due to the town and railway crossing of the same name, which had its last activity in the Pleistocene, this volcanic field is known more for the volcanic crater known as La Joya Honda, which is currently a tourist site in San Luis Potosí.

The volcanic field is composed of two cinder cones and three craters, Joyuela (Tuff cone) and Cerro Verde (Pyroplastic cone) and Joya Honda, Laguna de los Paláu and Pozo del Cármen.

References 

Volcanic fields
Pleistocene volcanoes
Volcanoes of San Luis Potosí